Macrobathra vividella is a moth in the family Cosmopterigidae. It was described by Cajetan Felder, Rudolf Felder and Alois Friedrich Rogenhofer in 1875. It is found in Australia.

References

Arctiidae genus list at Butterflies and Moths of the World of the Natural History Museum

Macrobathra
Moths described in 1875